Jakarta Indonesia Korean School (JIKS), formerly Jakarta International Korean School, is a South Korean international school in East Jakarta, Indonesia. As of 2005 it is the largest overseas South Korean school, with 1,450 students. As of 2009 the school's student body is twice as large as that of the Korean International School, HCMC in Ho Chi Minh City, the next-largest South Korean international school.

History
It was first established on February 1, 1975. Korean companies in Jakarta established JIKS. It initially had 26 students but the student population grew. In 1990 the Indonesian government gave the school a license to be an international school.

See also

 Koreans in Indonesia

References

External links
 Jakarta International Korean School  
 Jakarta International Korean School  

Korean international schools in Asia
International schools in Jakarta
1975 establishments in Indonesia
Educational institutions established in 1975
East Jakarta
Indonesia–South Korea relations